Tillandsia seleriana is a species of flowering plant in the genus Tillandsia. This species is native to southern Mexico and Central America.

Cultivars
 Tillandsia 'Anwyl Ecstasy'
 Tillandsia 'Anwyl Ecstasy #25'
 Tillandsia 'Glenorchy'
 Tillandsia 'Kia Ora'
 Tillandsia 'Peewee'
 Tillandsia 'Purple Passion'
 Tillandsia 'Selerepton'
 Tillandsia 'Squatty Body'
 Tillandsia 'Tiaro'
 Tillandsia 'Tina Parr'

References

BSI Cultivar Registry  Retrieved 11 October 2009

seleriana
Flora of Mexico
Flora of Central America
Plants described in 1902